Časlav (890s – 960) was Prince of the Serbs from  927 until his death in  960. He significantly expanded the Serbian Principality when he managed to unite several Slavic tribes, stretching his realm over the shores of the Adriatic Sea, the Sava river and the Morava valley. He successfully fought off the Magyars, who had crossed the Carpathians and ravaged Central Europe, when they invaded Bosnia. Časlav is remembered, alongside his predecessor Vlastimir, as founders of Serbia in the Middle Ages.

Časlav was the son of Klonimir, a son of Strojimir who ruled as co-prince in 851–880. He belongs to the first Serbian dynasty, the Vlastimirovićs (ruling since the early 7th century), and is the last known ruler of the family. His mother was a Bulgarian noblewoman chosen as wife of Klonimir by Boris I of Bulgaria himself.

Background

After the death of Prince Vlastimir, Serbia was an oligarchy ruled by his three sons: Mutimir, Gojnik and Strojimir, although Mutimir, the eldest, had supreme rule.

In the 880s, Mutimir seized the throne for himself, exiling his brothers and Klonimir, who was Strojimir's son, to the First Bulgarian Empire, to the court of Boris I. This was most likely due to treachery. Petar, the son of Gojnik, was kept at the Serbian court of Mutimir for political reasons, but he soon fled to Croatia.

When Mutimir died, his son Pribislav inherited the rule, but he only ruled for a year; Petar returned and defeated him in battle and seized the throne; Pribislav fled to Croatia with his brothers Bran and Stefan. Bran was defeated, captured and blinded (blinding was a Byzantine tradition meant to disqualify a person from taking the throne).  In 896, Klonimir returned from Bulgaria, backed by Boris I, taking the important stronghold of Destinikon. Klonimir was defeated and killed.

The Byzantine–Bulgarian Wars made the Bulgarian Empire de facto the most powerful Empire of Southeast Europe. The Bulgarians won after invading at the right time; they met little resistance in the north because of the Byzantines fighting the Arabs in Anatolia.

Early life

Časlav was born in the 890s, but before 896, in Preslav, the capital of the First Bulgarian Empire, growing up at the court of Simeon I the Great. His father was Klonimir, and his mother was a Bulgarian noblewoman.

In 924, Časlav was sent to Serbia with a large Bulgarian army. The army ravaged a good part of Serbia, forcing Zaharija, who at the time was the Prince of Serbia, to flee to Croatia. Simeon of Bulgaria summoned all the Serbian dukes to pay homage to their new prince, but instead of instating Časlav, he took them all captive, annexing Serbia. Bulgaria considerably expanded its borders to the west, now neighbouring its powerful ally Michael of Zahumlje and Croatia, where Zaharija was exiled and soon died. Croatia at this time was ruled by the most powerful monarch in Croatian history, Tomislav.

Reign

Bulgarian rule (923-927) was not popular, and many Serbs fled to Croatia and Byzantium. After the death of Simeon (927) Časlav and four friends escaped to Serbia. Časlav found popular support and restored the state, and many exiles quickly returned. Servia reappeared only to fall ca. 960 under Byzantine and later under Bulgarian rule again. He immediately submitted to the overlordship of Byzantine emperor Romanos I Lekapenos and gained financial and diplomatic support for his efforts. He maintained close ties with Byzantium throughout his reign. Byzantine influence (the Church in particular) greatly increased in Serbia, as did Orthodox influence from Bulgaria. The period was crucial to the future Christian demonym (Orthodox versus Catholic) adopted by the Serbian Church, as ties formed in this era were to have great importance on how the different Slavic churches lined up when they eventually split during the Great Schism of 1054. Many scholars have felt that the Serbs, being in the middle of Roman and Orthodox jurisdiction, could have gone either way, but, unfortunately, information on this era and region is scarce.

He enlarged Serbia, incorporating Travunia and parts of Bosnia while the borders of Časlav's state are unknown. He took over regions previously held by Michael of Zahumlje, who disappeared from the sources in 925.

War with Magyars and death

The Magyars had settled in the Carpathian basin in 895. Emperor Leo had employed the Magyars against the Bulgars in 894, during the Byzantine-Bulgarian Wars. In the years following, the Magyars mainly concentrated on the lands to the west of their realm. In 934 and 943 the Magyars raided far into the Balkans, deep into Byzantine Thrace.

According to De Administrando Imperio, the Magyars, led by Kisa, invaded Bosnia, and Časlav hurried and encountered them at the banks of river Drina. The Magyars were decisively defeated, with Kisa being slain by Časlav's voivode Tihomir. In gratitude, Časlav married off his daughter to Tihomir. Kisa's widow requested the Magyar leaders give her an army to exact vengeance. With an "unknown number" of troops, the widow returned and surprised Časlav at Syrmia. In the night, the Magyars attacked the Serbs, captured Časlav and all of his male relatives. On the command of the widow, all of them were bound by their hands and feet and thrown into the Sava river. The events are dated to around 960 or shortly thereafter, as De Administrando Imperio does not mention this event.

Aftermath

After Časlav's death the realm crumbled, local nobles restored the control of each province, and according to the De Administrando Imperio, his son-in-law Tihomir ruled Raška

The Catepanate of Ras was established between 971–976, during the rule of John Tzimiskes (r. 969–976). A seal of a strategos of Ras has been dated to Tzimiskes' reign, making it possible for Tzimiskes' predecessor Nikephoros II Phokas to have enjoyed recognition in Rascia. The protospatharios and katepano of Ras was a Byzantine governor named John. Data on the katepano of Ras during Tzimiskes' reign is missing. Byzantine military presence ended soon thereafter with the wars with Bulgaria, and was re-established only c. 1018 with the short-lived Theme of Sirmium, which, however, did not extend much into Rascia proper. Bosnia emerges as a state after the death of Časlav.

In the 990s, Jovan Vladimir emerges as the most powerful Serbian noble. With his court centered in Bar on the Adriatic coast, he had much of the Serbian Pomorje ('maritime') under his control including Travunia and Zachlumia. His realm may have stretched west- and northwards to include some parts of the Zagorje ('hinterlands', inland Serbia and Bosnia) as well. Cedrenus calls his realm "Trymalia or Serbia"; according to Radojicic and Ostrogorski, the Byzantines called it Zeta – Serbia, and its inhabitants Serbs. Vladimir's pre-eminent position over other Slavic nobles in the area explains why Emperor Basil II approached him for an anti-Bulgarian alliance. With his hands tied by war in Anatolia, Emperor Basil required allies for his war against Tsar Samuel, who had much of Macedonia. In retaliation, Samuel invaded Duklja in 997, and pushed through Dalmatia up to the city of Zadar, incorporating Bosnia and Serbia into his realm. After defeating Vladimir, Samuel reinstated him as a vassal Prince.

Legacy
Stevan Sremac (1855–1906) authored Veliki župan Časlav in 1903.

Family
According to the Chronicle of the Priest of Duklja, Časlav had one daughter:
 Unnamed, married Tihomir, who succeeded in ruling terram Rassa (Raška (region)).

See also
List of Serbian monarchs
Serbia in the Middle Ages
Chronicle of the Priest of Duklja
Battle of Drina (medieval)

Annotations

References

Sources
Primary sources
 
 
 
 
 

Secondary sources

External links
 Steven Runciman, A History of the First Bulgarian Empire, London 1930.
 

10th-century Serbian monarchs
Vlastimirović dynasty
Eastern Orthodox monarchs
People from Veliki Preslav
890s births
Year of birth uncertain
960 deaths
Executed monarchs
Byzantine people of Slavic descent
Serbian people of Bulgarian descent
Christian monarchs